Tritón y Sirena (also known as Tritón y Nereida) is a sculpture by Carlos Espino, installed along Puerto Vallarta's Malecón, in the Mexican state of Jalisco. Installed the 1990, the artwork depicts Triton (son of Poseidon and Amphitrite) and a Siren (sometimes considered a Nereid).

See also

 1990 in art
 Greek mythology in popular culture

References

External links
 

1990 establishments in Mexico
1990 sculptures
Centro, Puerto Vallarta
Outdoor sculptures in Puerto Vallarta
Sculptures of Triton (mythology)
Sculptures of men in Mexico
Sculptures of mermaids
Sculptures of women in Mexico
Statues in Jalisco
Sirens (mythology)